Fayziyev (Feminine: Fayziyeva) is a surname. It may refer to:
Latif Fayziyev, Tajik general
 ), Uzbek film director
Babamurat Fayziyev, Uzbek Sambo wrestler